Phuntsog Namgyal (Wylie: phun tshog rnam rgyal) (1604–1670) was the first chogyal (monarch) of Sikkim, now an Indian state. He consecrated in 1642 at the age of 38. Phuntsog was a fifth generation descendant of Khye Bumsa, a 13th-century prince from the Mi-nyak House in Kham in Eastern Tibet.

According to legend, Guru Rinpoche, a 9th-century Buddhist saint had foretold the event that a Phuntsog from the east would be the next chogyal of Sikkim. In 1642, three lamas, from the north, west, and south went in search for the chosen person. Near present-day Gangtok, they found a man churning milk. He offered them some refreshments and gave them shelter. So impressed were they by his deeds that they realised that he was a chosen one and immediately crowned him king. The crowning took place Norbughang near Yuksom on a stone slab in a pine covered hill, and he was anointed by sprinkling water from a sacred urn.

Phuntsog, along with the lamas, then converted the local Lepcha people to Buddhism and set about expanding his kingdom up to the Chumbi Valley in Tibet, parts of modern-day Darjeeling in the south, and parts of eastern Nepal.

Phuntsog moved his capital to Yuksam and instituted the first centralised administration. The kingdom was divided into twelve Dzongs, or districts under a Lepcha Dzongpon (governor) who headed a council of twelve ministers. During his reign Buddhism was consolidated as the established religion in Sikkim. He was succeeded by his son, Tensung Namgyal in 1670.

References

 Holidaying in Sikkim and Bhutan – published by Nest and Wings – ; pg 20-21
Modern history of Sikkim

External links
Travel Article on Yuksum, The Coronation Site Phuntsog Namgyal

History of Sikkim
Monarchs of Sikkim
1604 births
1670 deaths